Good Times is the eighth and final studio album by Dutch rock band Shocking Blue, released in 1974. The album is the first and only album recorded without the founding member, primary songwriter and guitarist Robbie van Leeuwen, who was replaced by Martin van Wijk.

Track listing 
All songs written by Martin van Wijk, except where noted.

Personnel
Shocking Blue
 Mariska Veres - vocals
 Martin van Wijk - lead guitar, backing vocals
 Cor van der Beek - drums
 Henk Smitskamp - bass guitar

External links 
 Good Times at allmusic

1974 albums
Shocking Blue albums